Griseosphinx is a genus of moths in the family Sphingidae. The genus was erected by Jean-Marie Cadiou and Ian Kitching in 1990.

Species
Griseosphinx marchandi  Cadiou 1996
Griseosphinx preechari Cadiou & Kitching 1990

References

Macroglossini
Moth genera